Brocas Helm is an American heavy metal band from San Francisco, California, founded in 1982. It is named after the medieval Brocas helm displayed in London's Rotunda, Woolwich.

History
Brocas Helm was founded in 1982 by Bobbie Wright, James Schumacher, Jack Hays and John Grey. In 1983, the band released their first demo. In 1984 they released their first album Into Battle on First Strike Records. Soon following the album was licensed to Steamhammer for distribution in Europe.

After some disagreements (for example, the cover of Into Battle was determined without the consent of the band) Brocas Helm and First Strike Records agreed to end their relationship.

The Black Death album with Tom Behney on guitar was created over five years of hard work. The main aim of the recording was to catch the interest of a high-quality record label. However, after a long fruitless search, the band founded Gargoyle Records and released the record themselves. After a brief break, Brocas Helm recorded and released the demo Ghost Story. Subsequently, they licensed the "Time of the Dark" (1997) and "Blood Machine"/"Skullfucker" singles.

In 2001, Brocas Helm played in Athens where a show was recorded. In 2003, they agreed to let Eat Metal Records release the official unabridged bootleg live album Black Death in Athens (2004). Also in 2004, the band released the third album Defender of the Crown.

The songs "Cry of the Banshee" and "Drink the Blood of the Priest" were used in the 2009 video game Brütal Legend.

Members

Current members
Bobbie Wright - Guitars, Vocals (1982–present)
Jim Schumacher - Bass (1982–present)
Jack Hays - Drums (1982–present)

Past members
John Grey - Guitars (1982-1984)
Tom "T-Bone" Behney - Guitars (1988)

Timeline

Discography

Studio albums 
 Into Battle (1984)
 Black Death (1988)
 Defender of the Crown (2004)

Live albums 
 Black Death in Athens (2004)

EPs 
 Ghost Story (1994)

Singles 
 "Time of the Dark" (1997)
 "Blood Machine"/"Skullfucker" (2000)

Splits 
 (split with Manilla Road) Clash of Iron Vol. I - Live at Keep It True (2007)

Demo records 
 Demo I (1983)
 Black Death (1987)
 Helm's Deep (1989)

References

External links
 Shadow Kingdom Records
 Metal-Archives

Musical groups from San Francisco
Musical groups established in 1982
1982 establishments in California
Musical groups disestablished in 2013
2013 disestablishments in California